Back for Good may refer to:

"Back for Good" (song), 1995 song recorded by British band Take That
Back for Good (album), 1998 album by Modern Talking